Baošići is a village in the municipality of Herceg Novi, Montenegro.

Demographics
According to the 2011 census, its population was 1,346.

References

Populated places in Herceg Novi Municipality
Populated places in Bay of Kotor
Mediterranean port cities and towns in Montenegro
Coastal towns in Montenegro